Early Side of Later is the third studio album by English singer-songwriter Matt Goss.

It was released on 21 June 2004 by Concept Music and reached No. 87 on the UK Albums Chart. The album featured the single, "Fly", which was released in July 2004 and peaked at No. 31 on the UK Singles Chart. The album was released after Goss appeared in the ITV reality show Hells Kitchen. The non-album single, "I'm Coming with Ya", which was released earlier in November 2003, reaching No. 22 on the singles charts, was included on the album as an enhanced video.

Track listing
 Fly – 4:04
 Watch me Fall – 4:04
 Carolyn – 5:10
 Face the Wind – 4:40
 Many Roads – 4:32
 Just for a Change – 3:08
 We Can't Lose – 4:32
 Perfect Girl – 3:07
 Best of Me - 4:54
 Fever - 4:38
 Goodbye - 5:35
 I'm Coming with Ya (video) - 5:38

Credits
 Matt Goss - vocals, keyboards, guitar
 Richard Steel - guitar
 Stanley Andrew - guitar
 Alison Pearce - keyboards
 Kevin Sutherland - keyboards
 Michael Daley - drums, bass, keyboards, producer
 Dick Beetham - mastering
 Wayne Lawes - mixer

References 

2004 albums
Matt Goss albums